Alexandre Pilat (born 20 April 1989 in Saint-Priest-en-Jarez, Loire) is a French rower.

References 
 

1989 births
Living people
People from Saint-Priest-en-Jarez
French male rowers
World Rowing Championships medalists for France
Sportspeople from Loire (department)